Bolitoglossa pandi is a species of salamander in the family Plethodontidae. It is endemic to the Cundinamarca Department of Colombia and only known from three locations on the western slopes of the Cordillera Oriental, including its type locality, Pandi; it is named after the type locality where it had been collected 50 years before being described as a new species in 1963.

Description
Bolitoglossa pandi was described based on a single specimen, the holotype, which is an adult female that measured  in snout–vent length (SVL). Individuals from a population in Supatá measured  SVL; females were significantly larger than males. Acosta-Galvis and Gutiérrez-Lamus (2012) give size range  SVL for mature females.

Habitat, ecology, and conservation
Salamanders from a population in Supatá were observed foraging on shrubs and perched on leaves at night. During the day, they were found hiding in the leaf litter and in the axils of bromeliads. Adults we perched on taller plants than juveniles. Their diet consisted of arthropods, in particular mites, beetles, and ants.

Bolitoglossa pandi is an uncommon species that is threatened by habitat loss and degradation caused by agriculture (both cultivation of crops and livestock farming). The habitat is severely fragmented. The Supatá population lives in a small protected area.

References

pandi
Amphibians of the Andes
Amphibians of Colombia
Endemic fauna of Colombia
Amphibians described in 1963
Taxa named by David B. Wake
Taxonomy articles created by Polbot